Andrade is a Portuguese and Spanish (Galician) surname.

People 
 Andrade (wrestler) (born 1989), Mexican professional wrestler also known as Andrade Cien Almas and La Sombra
 Nuestras Hijas de Regreso a Casa, founded in honor of kidnapping victim Lilia Alejandra Garcia Andrade
 Oswald de Andrade (1890–1954), a Brazilian poet and polemicist
 Francisco Franco Bahamonde, pseudonym of screenwriter Jaime de Andrade
 Andrade, Lady of Goddess Keep, a character in Melanie Rawn's novels
 Edward Andrade (1887–1971), English physicist, writer, and poet
 Marcelo Costa de Andrade, Brazilian serial killer
 Auguste Andrade (1793–1843), French composer
 Marcia Andrade Braga, Brazilian military officer and peacekeeper
 José Leandro Andrade, Uruguayan footballer

Andrade may also refer to:

Places 

Andrade, California

See also
Freire de Andrade (disambiguation)